Anderson Lake is a freshwater lake located in Fulton County, Illinois.

References

Lakes of Illinois
Bodies of water of Fulton County, Illinois